A federal pardon in the United States is the action of the President of the United States that completely sets aside the punishment for a federal crime. The authority to take such action is granted to the president by the U.S. Constitution. A pardon is one form of the clemency power of the president, the others being commutation of sentence, remission of fine or restitution, and reprieve. A person may decide not to accept a pardon, in which case it does not take effect, according to a Supreme Court majority opinion in Burdick v. United States. In 2021, the 10th Circuit ruled that acceptance of a pardon does not constitute a legal confession of guilt, recognizing the Supreme Court's earlier language as dicta.

Under the Constitution, the president's clemency power extends to all federal criminal offenses, except in cases of impeachment. All requests for executive clemency for federal offenses are normally directed to the Office of the Pardon Attorney in the U.S. Department of Justice for investigation and review, but the president may bypass that office. President Donald Trump frequently issued pardons and commutations after conferral with his White House staff, though clemency was granted to some applicants through the Office of the Pardon Attorney.

The Constitution grants the president the power to pardon "offenses against the United States". An offense that violates state law, but not federal law, is an offense against that state rather than an offense against the United States; however, the Supreme Court has never ruled on this matter or in the President's power to grant a habeas corpus petition for a state offense where it has been denied by a federal court.

The full extent of a president's power to pardon has not been fully tested; dicta in Ex parte McCardle informs that it is absolute. Pardons have been used for presumptive cases, such as when President Gerald Ford pardoned Richard Nixon, who had not been charged with anything, over any possible crimes connected with the Watergate scandal, but the Supreme Court has never considered the legal effect of such pardons. There is disagreement about how the pardon power applies to cases involving obstructions of an impeachment. Also, the ability of a president to pardon themselves (self-pardon) has never been tested in the courts, because, to date, no president has ever taken that action. There has also been speculation as to whether secret pardons are possible.

Constitutional basis 
The pardon power of the President is based on Article II, Section 2, Clause 1 of the U.S. Constitution, which provides:

The U.S. Supreme Court has interpreted the provision to include the power to grant pardons, conditional pardons, commutations of sentence, conditional commutations of sentence, remissions of fines and forfeitures, respites and amnesties.

Definitions 
 A pardon is an executive order granting clemency for a conviction. It may be granted "at any time" after the commission of the crime. As per Justice Department regulations, convicted persons may only apply five or more years after their sentence has been completed. However, the President's power to pardon is not restricted by any temporal constraints except that the crime must have been committed. A pardon is an expression of the President's forgiveness and ordinarily is granted in recognition of the applicant's acceptance of responsibility for the crime and established good conduct for a significant period of time after conviction or completion of sentence. It does not signify innocence. Its practical effect is the restoration of civil rights and statutory disabilities (e.g., firearm rights, occupational licensing) associated with a past criminal conviction. In rarer cases, such as the pardon of Richard Nixon, a pardon can also halt criminal proceedings and prevent an indictment, though this has not been tested in court.
 A reprieve is a temporary postponement of a punishment (refer to pardon/related concepts).
 A commutation is the mitigation of the sentence of someone currently serving a sentence for a crime pursuant to a conviction, without cancelling the conviction itself.

Early history 
Alexander Hamilton defended the pardon power in The Federalist Papers, particularly in Federalist No. 74.

At the Virginia Ratifying Convention, the delegate George Mason argued against ratification partly on the grounds that "the President ought not to have the power of pardoning, because he may frequently pardon crimes which were advised by himself."

Pardons granted by presidents from George Washington until Grover Cleveland's first term (1885–1889) were hand written by the president. After typewriters came to be used for regular White House business, pardons were prepared for the president by administrative staff requiring only that the president sign them.

Modern process 
All federal pardon petitions are addressed to the President, who grants or denies the request. Typically, applications for pardons are referred for review and non-binding recommendation by the Office of the Pardon Attorney, an official of the United States Department of Justice. The number of pardons and reprieves granted has varied from administration to administration. Fewer pardons have been granted since World War II.

A federal pardon can be issued prior to the start of a legal case or inquiry, prior to any indictments being issued, for unspecified offenses, and prior to or after a conviction for a federal crime. Ford's broad federal pardon of former president Richard M. Nixon in 1974 for "all offenses against the United States which he, Richard Nixon, has committed or may have committed or taken part in during the period from January 20, 1969 through August 9, 1974" is a notable example of a fixed-period federal pardon that came prior to any indictments being issued and that covered unspecified federal offenses that may or may not have been committed. The legal effectiveness of such a form of pardon has not been tested in court.

The Justice Department normally requires that anyone filing a petition for a pardon wait five years after conviction or release prior to receiving a pardon. The constitutionality of open pardons, such as Ford's pardon of Nixon, has never been judicially tested in the Supreme Court and is open to question.

While clemency may be granted without the filing of a formal request, in most cases the Office of the Pardon Attorney will consider only petitions from persons who have completed their sentences and, in addition, have demonstrated their ability to lead a responsible and productive life for a significant period after conviction or release from confinement.

The Supreme Court ruled in United States v. Wilson (1833) that a pardon could be rejected by the convict. In Burdick v. United States (1915), the court specifically said: "Circumstances may be made to bring innocence under the penalties of the law. If so brought, escape by confession of guilt implied in the acceptance of a pardon may be rejected, preferring to be the victim of the law rather than its acknowledged transgressor, preferring death even to such certain infamy." Commutations (reduction in prison sentence), unlike pardons (restoration of civil rights after prison sentence had been served) may not be refused. In Biddle v. Perovich , the subject of the commutation did not want to accept life in prison but wanted the death penalty restored. The Supreme Court said, "Just as the original punishment would be imposed without regard to the prisoner's consent and in the teeth of his will, whether he liked it or not, the public welfare, not his consent, determines what shall be done."

Limitations 
Federal pardons issued by the president apply only to federal offenses; they do not apply to state or local offenses or private civil offenses. Federal pardons also do not apply to cases of impeachment. Pardons for state crimes are handled by governors or a state pardon board.

One limitation to the president's power to grant pardons is "in cases of impeachment." This means that the president cannot use a pardon to stop an officeholder from being impeached, or to undo the effects of an impeachment and conviction.

Acceptance by the recipient 
In United States v. Wilson (1833), the U.S. Supreme Court held that a pardon can be rejected by the intended recipient and must be affirmatively accepted to be officially recognized by the courts. In that case, George Wilson was convicted of robbing the US Mail and was sentenced to death. Due to his friends' influence, Wilson was pardoned by President Andrew Jackson, but Wilson refused the pardon and the Supreme Court held that his rejection was valid and the court could not force a pardon upon him; and consequently the pardon must be introduced to the court by "plea, motion, or otherwise" to be considered as a point of fact and evidence.

According to Associate Justice Joseph McKenna, writing the majority opinion in the U.S. Supreme Court case Burdick v. United States, a pardon is "an imputation of guilt and acceptance of a confession of it[.]" Federal courts have yet to make it clear how this logic applies to persons who are deceased (such as Henry Ossian Flipper, who was pardoned by Bill Clinton), those who are relieved from penalties as a result of general amnesties, and those whose punishments are relieved via a commutation of sentence (which cannot be rejected in any sense of the language). Brian Kalt, a law professor at Michigan State University, states that presidents sometimes (albeit rarely) grant pardons on the basis of innocence, and argues that if a president issues a pardon because they think an individual is innocent, then accepting that pardon would not be an admission of guilt.

Residual effects of convictions 
A presidential pardon restores various rights lost as a result of the pardoned offense and may lessen to some extent the stigma arising from a conviction, but it does not erase or expunge the record of the conviction itself. Therefore, a person who is granted a pardon must still disclose any convictions on any form where such information is required although the person may also disclose the fact that a pardon was received. Also, as most civil disabilities arising from a criminal conviction, such as loss of the right to vote and hold state public office, are imposed by state rather than federal law, they may be removed only by state action.

Self-pardons 
The legal and constitutional ability of a president to pardon himself (self-pardon) is an unresolved issue. During the Watergate scandal, President Nixon's lawyer suggested that a self-pardon would be legal, while the Department of Justice issued a memorandum opinion on August 5, 1974, stating that a president cannot pardon himself. The 1974 memo laid out a scenario in which, under the Twenty-fifth Amendment to the United States Constitution, the president could declare himself unable to perform his duties and could appoint the vice president as acting president. The acting president could then pardon the president and "thereafter the president could either resign or resume the duties of his office." The informal Nixon memo only addressed the presidential self-pardon in 69 words with no citations and lacks legal analysis, and is thus not authoritative on the issue.

The issue arose again in 1998, during the impeachment of President Bill Clinton.

On July 22, 2017, President Donald Trump tweeted, "While all agree the U.S. President has the complete power to pardon, why think of that when only crime so far is LEAKS against us. FAKE NEWS", prompting a series of news article and online commentary regarding the president's ability to pardon relatives, aides, and possibly even himself in relation to the 2017 Special Counsel investigation, which ultimately concluded President Donald Trump could not be indicted at the time. The New York Times reported that during Trump's closing days in office he told aides he was considering pardoning himself.

Constitutionality of self-pardon 
Common arguments against self-pardons include the themes of self-judging and self-dealing, the unjust nature of the president being above the law, violations of the public trust, the inclusion of the word "grant" in the relevant clause (one cannot grant something to oneself), the definition of "pardon" (because one cannot grant forgiveness to oneself), and the inadequacy of other safeguards such as political consequences. However, such arguments have been disputed, and since the Supreme Court has issued constitutional rulings that affirmed the president's "unlimited" pardon power, a constitutional amendment or a Supreme Court decision on a self-pardon would be required to settle the constitutionality of a self-pardon.

Constitutional issues of the pardon power have been raised in multiple Supreme Court cases. In Ex parte Garland, the Supreme Court majority ruled:

In Marbury v. Madison, Chief Justice John Marshall wrote regarding the presidential powers:

Controversial use 
The pardon power was controversial from the outset; many Anti-Federalists remembered examples of royal abuses of the pardon power in Europe, and warned that the same would happen in the new republic. Critics such as the Anti-Federalists have argued that pardons have been used more often for the sake of political expediency than to correct judicial error.

In the 18th century, George Washington granted the first high-profile federal pardon to leaders of the Whiskey Rebellion on his final day in office.

In the 19th century, Andrew Johnson controversially issued sweeping pardons of thousands of former Confederate officials and military personnel after the American Civil War.

In the 20th century, Gerald Ford pardoned former president Richard Nixon on September 8, 1974, for official misconduct which gave rise to the Watergate scandal. Polls showed a majority of Americans disapproved of the pardon, and Ford's public-approval ratings tumbled afterward. Other publicly controversial uses of the pardon power include Jimmy Carter's grant of amnesty to Vietnam-era draft dodgers on his second day in office, January 21, 1977; George H. W. Bush's pardons of 75 people, including six Reagan administration officials accused or convicted in connection with the Iran–Contra affair; and Bill Clinton's commutation of sentences for 16 members of FALN in 1999.

In the 21st century, Clinton's pardons of 140 people on his last day in office, January 20, 2001, including billionaire fugitive Marc Rich and his own brother, Roger Clinton, were heavily criticized.

President Donald Trump issued his first pardon to former Arizona sheriff Joe Arpaio on August 25, 2017; Arpaio had been convicted of criminal contempt in federal court. The pardon of Arpaio was relatively unusual in being issued early in Trump's presidency. It was met with widespread criticism from political opponents. On November 25, 2020, Trump announced, via Twitter, that he had pardoned former General and Trump National Security Advisor Michael Flynn. Flynn had pleaded guilty to one count of making false statements to the FBI, an offense which prompted Trump to fire Flynn as his national security advisor 23 days after taking office. On December 23, 2020, Trump pardoned 26 friends and allies, including his longtime ally Roger Stone, former campaign chairman Paul Manafort, and Charles Kushner, his son-in-law's father.

Symbolic use 
A symbolic use of the presidential pardon is the National Thanksgiving Turkey Presentation in November, in which a domestic turkey is pardoned from being killed for Thanksgiving dinner and is allowed to live out its life on a farm.

See also 

 List of people pardoned or granted clemency by the president of the United States

References 

Pardons
Pardon presidential
Presidency of the United States